John Francis Dittrich (May 7, 1933 – July 5, 1995) was a player in the National Football League and American Football League for the Chicago Cardinals, Green Bay Packers, Oakland Raiders, and the Buffalo Bills as a guard. He played at the collegiate level at the University of Wisconsin–Madison.

Biography
Dittrich was born John Francis Dittrich on May 7, 1933 in Sheboygan, Wisconsin. His family later moved to Cudahy, a suburb of Milwaukee, where he attended Cudahy High School. He then attended the University of Wisconsin (now University of Wisconsin-Madison).

Dittrich was drafted in 1956 in round 6, pick 9 (70th overall) by the Chicago Cardinals. He played 12 games that season. In 1959, he played 12 games for the Green Bay Packers. In 1960, he played in 11 games for the Oakland Raiders, and in 1961 he played in 12 games at Buffalo.

Dittrich died in Orlando, Florida in 1995.

See also
Green Bay Packers players
List of Buffalo Bills players

References

1933 births
1995 deaths
Buffalo Bills players
Chicago Cardinals players
Green Bay Packers players
Oakland Raiders players
Wisconsin Badgers football players
Sportspeople from Sheboygan, Wisconsin
People from Cudahy, Wisconsin
Players of American football from Wisconsin
American Football League players